The Sutri Treasure is an important Lombardic hoard found at Sutri, Italy in the late nineteenth century that is currently in the collections of the British Museum in London.

Discovery
The rich grave group was found in 1878 near the town of Sutri in the province of Viterbo in central Italy. Dating to the 6th-7th centuries AD, the treasure was buried at a time of conflict between the Kingdom of the Lombards and the Eastern Roman Empire. Nine years after its discovery, the hoard was purchased by the British Museum, where it resides to this day.

Description
Given the large number of prestigious items in the treasure, it probably belonged to a noble lady of high rank from the Lombardic court. It includes a blue glass drinking horn, two greenish-blue small amphoras, a gilded fan-shaped silver brooch,  a gold and garnet encrusted S-shaped brooch, a simple gold cross and a pair of earrings with triple pendants. A number of other items (including a pin, beads, coins, another drinking horn and a third brooch) were not purchased by the museum at the time; their current whereabouts is unknown.

Gallery

See also
 Sutton Hoo 
Artres Treasure
Domagnano Treasure

References

Further reading
S. Marzinzik, Masterpieces: Early Medieval Art (London, British Museum Press, 2013)
T.W. Potter and A.C. King, Excavations at the Mola di Mon (British School at Rome London in association with the British Museum, 1997)

Medieval European objects in the British Museum
Medieval European metalwork objects
Treasure troves of Italy
Treasure troves of Medieval Europe
1878 archaeological discoveries
Italy–United Kingdom relations
Drinking horns